Talk to La Bomb is the second album by the electronic music group Brazilian Girls. It was released on September 12, 2006, by Verve Forecast. The album continued with their "genre-bending" style, drawing from diverse genres such as electro ("Jique") and tango ("Rules of the Game").

Track listing
All songs written by Brazilian Girls.

 "Jique"
 "All About Us"
 "Last Call"
 "Never Met a German"
 "Sweatshop"
 "Le Territoire"
 "Rules of the Game"
 "Talk to the Bomb"
 "Nicotine"
 "Tourist Trap"
 "Sexy Asshole"
 "Problem"

References

External links
 Talk to La Bomb at Verve Forecast website

Brazilian Girls albums
2006 albums
Albums produced by Mark Plati
Albums produced by Ric Ocasek
Verve Records albums